The 2012 GP Miguel Induráin was the 59th edition of the GP Miguel Induráin cycle race and was held on 31 March 2012. The race started and finished in Estella. The race was won by Daniel Moreno.

General classification

References

2012
2012 UCI Europe Tour
2012 in Spanish road cycling